The 2010 United States Senate election in California took place on November 2, 2010. The election was held alongside 33 other United States Senate elections in addition to congressional, state, and various local elections. Incumbent Democratic U.S. Senator Barbara Boxer won re-election to a fourth term.

Democratic primary

Candidates 
 Barbara Boxer, incumbent United States Senator
 Mickey Kaus, Journalist/Blogger
 Brian Quintana, Businessman/Educator

Controversies

Boxer 
In 2009, Boxer was criticized for correcting a general who called her "ma'am". Brigadier General Michael Walsh was testifying on the Louisiana coastal restoration process in the wake of Hurricane Katrina and answered Boxer's query with "ma'am" when Boxer interrupted him. "Do me a favor," Boxer said. "can you say 'senator' instead of 'ma'am?'" "Yes, ma'am," Walsh interjected.  "It's just a thing, I worked so hard to get that title, so I'd appreciate it. Thank you," she said. The Army's guide to protocol instructs service members to call members of the U.S. Senate "sir", "ma'am" or "senator". Fiorina used this incident prominently in campaign ads, as did David Zucker, who directed a humorous commercial for RightChange.com titled 'Call Me Senator'.

Results

Republican primary

Candidates 
 Tom Campbell, economist, former U.S. Representative, and nominee for U.S. Senate in 2000
 Carly Fiorina, former Chief Executive Officer of Hewlett-Packard
 Chuck DeVore, State Assemblyman from Irvine
 Tim Kalemkarian
 Al Ramirez, businessman

Controversies

Fiorina 
In February 2010, Carly Fiorina put out a campaign ad attacking Republican rival Tom Campbell featuring a "demon sheep", creating international, mostly negative, publicity.

The Los Angeles Times research of public records indicated Fiorina had failed to vote in most elections. Fiorina responded by saying, "I'm a lifelong registered Republican but I haven't always voted, and I will provide no excuse for it. You know, people die for the right to vote. And there are many, many Californians and Americans who exercise that civic duty on a regular basis. I didn't. Shame on me."

Campbell 
Former State Senator and California Secretary of State Bruce McPherson alleged that during a telephone call with Carly Fiorina's campaign manager, Marty Wilson, Wilson expressed surprise that McPherson was endorsing the candidacy of Tom Campbell, and called him an anti-Semite. Subsequently, Wilson strongly denied having made that charge against Campbell, thus leading to a controversy for the Fiorina campaign, where the credibility of long-time Sacramento political operative Marty Wilson was called into a comparison with that of Bruce McPherson.

On March 5, the three principal Republican primary candidates, Campbell, DeVore, and Fiorina participated in a live, on-air debate, which was broadcast on KTKZ in Sacramento. The debate was called by Campbell, in order to respond to accusations of "anti-Semitism," and otherwise being unfriendly to the interests of Israel.

Campbell had also been criticized for having accepted campaign contributions (during his 2000 Senate race), from then-University of South Florida professor Sami Al-Arian. On March 2, 2006, Al-Arian entered a guilty plea to a charge of conspiracy to help the Islamic Jihad Movement in Palestine, a "specially designated terrorist" organization; he was sentenced to 57 months in prison, and ordered deported following his prison term.  The usually subdued Tom Campbell responded very strongly to the accusations coming out of the Fiorina campaign, saying, "I called for this debate today so that both of my opponents can bring up absolutely any charge they want. Air it, and let me respond to it. But there’s no place for calling me anti-Semitic, then denying it. That whispering campaign, that 'silent slander,' stops today."

A dispute had been triggered as well by Campbell's 2002 letter in defense of Al-Arian.  Campbell said he had not been aware of the charges against Al-Arian when he wrote his January 21, 2002, letter to USF's president, asking USF not to discipline Al-Arian.

He also said he had not been aware that Al-Arian had said, in a speech discussed in an O'Reilly interview before Campbell wrote his letter:  "Jihad is our path. Victory to Islam. Death to Israel."  Campbell said:  I did not hear, I did not read, I was not aware of statements Sami Al-Arian had made relative to Israel.  And I would not have written the letter had I known about those. ... To say 'Death to Israel' is abhorrent, it's horrible.

Campbell said he was sorry he wrote the letter, adding that he did not know about the statements at the time. He said he should have researched that matter more thoroughly, and he would have known.

Campbell had initially maintained that Al-Arian had never contributed to Campbell's 2000 Senate campaign.  That turned out to be untrue. Campbell also initially said his letter defending Al-Arian was sent before the O'Reilly 2001 television broadcast where Al-Arian admitted saying "death to Israel," but that also turned out to be incorrect.  Campbell said his misstatements were the result of the events having taken place years prior.

Polling

Results

Third party primaries

Candidates 
American Independent
 Don Grundmann, chiropractor and candidate for U.S. Senate in 2006
 Edward Noonan, small business owner
 Al Salehi, political analyst

Green
 Duane Roberts, community volunteer

Libertarian
 Gail Lightfoot, retired nurse

Peace and Freedom
 Marsha Feinland, retired teacher and former Peace and Freedom presidential candidate

Results

General election

Candidates 
The following were certified by the California Secretary of State as candidates in the primary election for senator.

 Carly Fiorina (Republican), former Chief Executive Officer of Hewlett Packard.
 Edward C. Noonan (American Independent Party), small business owner
 Barbara Boxer (Democratic), incumbent U.S. Senator
 Duane Roberts (Green), community volunteer
 Gail Lightfoot (Libertarian), retired nurse
 Marsha Feinland (Peace and Freedom), retired teacher and former Peace and Freedom presidential candidate

Campaign 
Boxer criticized Fiorina's choice "to become a CEO, lay off 30,000 workers, ship jobs overseas [and] have two yachts." A spokesman for Fiorina responded that the Fiorinas were a two-yacht family because they spent time in both California and Washington, D.C. Boxer also claimed that Fiorina "skirted the law" by selling equipment to Iran during her tenure as HP's CEO, also claiming that the equipment may have ended up in the hands of the Iranian military.

Debates 
The only debate took place on September 1 at Saint Mary's College of California in Moraga. It was sponsored by San Francisco Chronicle, KTVU, and KQED.

Predictions

Polling

Fundraising

Results 
Despite the last poll before the election showed Fiorina only trailing by 4 points, on election night Boxer defeated Fiorina by a ten point margin, and around a one million vote majority. Boxer performed extremely well in Los Angeles County, and the San Francisco Bay Area. Boxer was declared the winner shortly after the polls closed. Fiorina conceded defeat to Boxer at 11:38 P.M.

Results by county 
Results from the Secretary of State of California.

References

External links 
 California Secretary of State – Elections and Voter Information
 U.S. Congress candidates for California at Project Vote Smart
 California U.S. Senate from OurCampaigns.com
 Campaign contributions from Open Secrets
 2010 California Senate Election graph of multiple polls from Pollster.com
 Election 2010: California Senate from Rasmussen Reports
 2010 California Senate Race from Real Clear Politics
 2010 California Senate Race from CQ Politics
 Race profile from The New York Times
Debates
 California Senate Republican Primary Debate, C-SPAN, May 8, 2010
 California Senate Debate, C-SPAN, September 1, 2010], San Francisco Chronicle, KQED KTVU-TV, full video (57:00)
 California Senate Debate, C-SPAN, September 29, 2010, full video (56:54)
Official campaign sites (Archived)
 Barbara Boxer
 Marsha Feinland
 Carly Fiorina
 Don Grundmann
 Gail Lightfoot
 Peter Putnam
 Duane Roberts

2010 California elections
California
2010